Juan Pablo Begazo Valvidia (born 18 May 1988) is a Peruvian footballer who plays for Universidad Técnica de Cajamarca in the Torneo Descentralizado, as a goalkeeper.

Club career
Begazo began his senior career by joining FBC Melgar's first team in 2006. In his first season, he served as a back-up keeper for Diego Carranza and Manuel Riofrío. The following season he made seven Torneo Descentralizado league appearances as the fourth choice goalkeeper under manager Rafael Castillo.

References

1988 births
Living people
People from Arequipa
Association football goalkeepers
Peruvian footballers
FBC Melgar footballers
Universidad Técnica de Cajamarca footballers
Peruvian Primera División players